Ruotolo Peak is a peak, 2,490 m, surmounting the north side of Griffith Glacier, close west of the California Plateau and Watson Escarpment. Mapped by United States Geological Survey (USGS) from surveys and U.S. Navy air photos, 1960–64. Named by Advisory Committee on Antarctic Names (US-ACAN) for Lieutenant Commander Anthony P. Ruotolo, aircraft pilot with U.S. Navy Squadron VX-6 on Operation Deep Freeze 1966 and 1967.
 

Mountains of Marie Byrd Land